Praealticus semicrenatus, the Lembeh rockskipper, is a species of combtooth blenny found in the western central Pacific ocean, around Indonesia.

References

semicrenatus
Taxa named by Wilbert McLeod Chapman
Fish described in 1951